The Nerves were an American power pop trio formed in 1974 and based in Los Angeles, California featuring guitarist Jack Lee, bassist Peter Case, and drummer Paul Collins.  All three members composed songs and sang.  They managed an international tour in the U.S. and Canada, including dates with The Ramones, and performances for the troops as part of the United Services Organization (USO).

Career
The Nerves lasted a short time and self-released one self-titled four-song EP in 1976, featuring the songs "Hanging on the Telephone" (Lee), "When You Find Out" (Case), "Give Me Some Time" (Lee), and "Working Too Hard" (Collins).  In addition to being the drummer, Paul Collins was also the trio's manager and did most of the bookings and promotion. The Nerves' EP was distributed by independent Bomp! Records and officially re-released on CD and vinyl by Alive Records in 2008, followed by a second release of The Breakaways, an album of post-Nerves recordings made by Collins and Case prior to the formation of Collins' group The Beat.

Despite their limited lifespan and discography, The Nerves remain notable for many reasons.  They were the founding vanguard of the Los Angeles  punk and pop scenes that eventually produced The Knack, The Beat and The Plimsouls.  After The Nerves' break-up, Case and Collins formed The Breakaways with Pat Stengl, a group that would have an even shorter lifespan than The Nerves.  Thereafter, however, Case and Collins went on to front more notable groups, The Plimsouls (who had a Billboard Top 100 hit with "A Million Miles Away") and The Beat, respectively.  But perhaps the most notable legacy of the group is the song "Hanging on the Telephone": Blondie later covered the song on their album Parallel Lines and turned it into a UK top 5 hit, and thanks to Blondie's success, the song has become something of a standard, later re-done by groups as diverse as L7, Def Leppard, Cat Power (whose version was featured in Cingular commercials in 2006), and Hep Alien, Lane Kim's fictional band on dramedy The Gilmore Girls.  While it is likely some of these artists are unaware of the original Nerves version, others were also from Los Angeles and what was, at the time, its small underground music scene and would be able to reference the original.  Blondie included a second Lee composition on Parallel Lines, "Will Anything Happen?"  Lee also went on to write a hit for Paul Young, "Come Back and Stay".

"Hanging on the Telephone" and "When You Find Out" were later released on a 1993 Rhino Records power-pop compilation, DIY: Come Out and Play - American Power Pop I (1975-1978), which Allmusic gave a five star review.  The Nerves also appeared on the album's cover.  More recently, Rhino included an unreleased Nerves track, Case's "One-Way Ticket", on the 2005 compilation Children of Nuggets: Original Artyfacts from the Second Psychedelic Era, 1976–1995, a sequel to their Nuggets: Original Artyfacts from the First Psychedelic Era, 1965-1968 compilations.

In 2008, Alive Records released One Way Ticket, a CD compilation of the remastered tracks of the Nerves' original EP, along with demos and other previously unreleased material. Following the success of The Nerves' CD reissue, Alive Records released The Breakaways, an album of post-Nerves recordings featuring Collins and Case prior to the formation of The Beat.

In 2011, the American rock band Green Day launched the American Idiot Broadway Musical Production. On any night that an original cast member left the show, they included a live rendition of the song "Walking Out On Love," which was written by Paul Collins. The song was previously recorded by The Nerves, The Breakaways and The Beat. At the end of the musical's run, The Paul Collins Beat joined Green Day on-stage for live performances in New York.

Reunion tribute
In spring 2012, Case and Collins announced a reunion tour paying tribute to their bands The Nerves, The Breakaways, The Beat and The Plimsouls. The band line-up for the Collins and Case tour was augmented by members of The Paul Collins Beat (Timm Buechler, bass, and Amos Pitsch, drums), offering audiences with a full-band electric showcase. The reunion was not billed as The Nerves, because Jack Lee chose not to be part of the tour. The tour included a date in Austin, Texas, where actor Bill Murray made a surprise appearance at the concert to introduce the band. Collins' group The Beat had previously appeared on the Caddyshack original motion picture soundtrack alongside Murray in 1979.

Collins was dismissed from the tour before its completion, due to personal differences.

The tour was followed by a tribute LP/cassette on Volar Records/I Hate Rock n Roll, entitled Under the Covers Vol. 2: A Tribute to Paul Collins, Peter Case, and Jack Lee, that included 18 bands, such as Grass Widow, Davila 666, Hunx and his Punx, Audacity, Tijuana Panthers, and the Mantles.

Lee has performed annually as a solo artist with his group Jack Lee Inferno.

References

External links

 The Nerves & Paul Collins' Beat Fan Site
 The Nerves' Story on Peter Case's Official Site
 Includes Nerves info on Paul Collins Beat Official Site

American power pop groups
Alive Naturalsound Records artists